The Macau Wine Museum is a wine museum in Sé, Macau, China. It is located next to the Grand Prix Museum.

History
The museum was inaugurated on 25 December 1995.

Description
The museum spans over an area of 1,400 m2. Its collection contains 1,115 different wines. Its earliest bottle is a 1815 Martle. The museum is divided into three sections: history of wine-making, wine collections, and wine displays.

Portuguese wines are displayed in accordance with the vintages respective region of origin and a wine tasting station.

See also 

 Macau Grand Prix Museum
 List of museums in Macau

References 

Museums in Macau
Wine museums
Museums established in 1995
1995 establishments in Macau